Blouse is an American alternative rock band based in Portland, Oregon formed in 2010 by Charlie Hilton (vocals, guitar) and Patrick Adams (bass).

History 

Hilton and Adams met while attending the Graphic Design program at Portland State University.  They began to record with Jacob Portrait (producer, guitar) at the warehouse in Portland, Oregon. Following the release of two demo tracks on their Bandcamp, the band was signed to Brooklyn-based label Captured Tracks. Their first single "Into Black", was released in March 2011 by Captured Tracks. Succeeding their release of "Into Black", Sub Pop released the band's second 7" single "Shadow" in May 2011. Blouse released their debut self-titled LP in November 2011. In 2011, the band was joined by Paul Roper on drums.

The Blouse LP was said by Pitchfork to be like music from the "Reagan Era" but still being able to fit in with the music of 2010. Much of their album is regarded as being reminiscent of the 80's.  Blouse has also integrated post-punk instrumentation into their sound.

Discography

Studio albums

Singles

References

External links 

Blouse at Captured Tracks

Alternative rock groups from Oregon
Musical groups from Portland, Oregon
2010 establishments in Oregon
Musical groups established in 2010